By-elections are scheduled to be held in Pakistan on 14 October 2018 and 21 October 2018. These elections will be held on twelve constituencies for the National Assembly of Pakistan and twenty-seven constituencies belonging to four provincial assemblies of Pakistan namely Provincial Assembly of Punjab, Provincial Assembly of Sindh, Provincial Assembly of Khyber Pakhtunkhwa, and Provincial Assembly of Balochistan.

References 

2018 elections in Pakistan
By-elections in Pakistan